Final Diagnosis is a 1997 science fiction novel by Northern Irish author James White, part of his Sector General series.

Plot
A man suffering from multiple mysterious illnesses and allergic reactions is labelled a hypochondriac. Finally he is sent to Sector General as a last resort. He befriends his fellow alien patients, telling them his life history. Rather than dismissing his complaints, the attentive hospital doctors develop a theory, and bring him back to his home planet. At the scene of a childhood accident that seems to have started it all, explanations are found.

References

1997 British novels
1997 science fiction novels
Novels by James White (author)
Medical novels
Tor Books books